Abortion in Costa Rica is severely restricted by criminal law. Currently, abortions are allowed in Costa Rica only in order to preserve the life or physical health of the woman. Abortions are illegal in almost all cases, including when the pregnancy is a result of rape or incest and when the fetus suffers from medical problems or birth defects. Both social and economic factors have led to this legal status. It remains unclear whether abortions are legal to preserve the mental health of the woman, though the 2013 United Nations abortion report says Costa Rica does allow abortions concerning the mental health of a woman.

Currently under the Carlos Alvarado Quesada administration, the discussion of the "Technical Norm" to regulate the already legal therapeutic abortion is a hot issue, as the Evangelical parties (who have a large bloc in the Legislative Assembly) vigorously oppose it.

Legal issues

The Costa Rican Penal Code in its article 121 establishes that no abortion performed to protect the life or health of the mother, carried with the consent of the woman and participation of an authorized physician or obstetrician, can be punished. This is known as "abortion with impunity". However, as mentioned before, the lack of a regulatory norm makes application difficult.

Article 93 allows the judges to grant judicial pardon to a woman who has caused her own abortion as a consequence of rape. Articles 118, 119, 120 and 122 punish different types of abortion from three months to ten years of prison depending on the circumstances. In all cases the law increases the penalty if the fetus had more than six months of development.

Induced abortion is classified as a crime in the Penal Code of 1970, included in the crimes against life. Doctors who suspect that a woman has had an abortion are obligated to report them to the Organization of Judicial Investigation (Organizacion de Investigacion Judicial). Punishment varies depending on whether the woman consented or not to the procedure and whether the fetus had reached six months' gestation at the time.

Although the United Nations Human Rights Council recommended in 1999 that Costa Rica should introduce more exceptions to the prohibition of abortions, the actual Costa Rican legislature intended to increase penalties for abortions due to their Roman Catholic background. Laura Chinchilla, strictly opposed to the legalization of abortion, was president of Costa Rica from 2010 to 2014, during which reforms to the law were not expected.

According to the Center for Reproductive Rights (translated from Spanish), "therapeutic abortion is legal according to Article 121 of the Penal Code; however, adequate measures have not been taken to guarantee this right. Specifically, there are no specialized protocols or guides that tell health care workers how to proceed with an abortion if the life or physical or mental health of the woman is at risk. There are also no effective judicial or administrative mechanisms through which this procedure can be demanded to be performed."

In 2003, there were no women or doctors in prison for having or performing an abortion. However, there was one lay woman, an untrained midwife, who was accused of carrying out abortions and served a three-year sentence.

Public opinion
According to Planned Parenthood public opinion is heavily influenced by the Roman Catholic Church. Given the influence of Catholic doctrine on public policy and culture, abortion under any circumstance is illegal and understood as murder.  Accordingly, almost all doctors will not carry out an abortion for any reason at all.

According to a survey made by the University of Costa Rica whilst most Costa Rican support therapeutic abortion (55%) very few support completely free abortion (only 11%).

The poll showed that 55% support abortion to save the mother’s life, against 45% who oppose. 49% supports it in case of non-life threatening health problems against 39%, 43% in case the fetus has life-incompatible malformation versus 49% against, only 29% supports it in case of pregnancy of a child versus 57% against, only 28% in cases of rape against 61% opposing, and only 11% supports only on the woman’s request against 78% opposing it. The poll also show that half of Costa Ricans have no knowledge of what therapeutic abortion is, and almost all opposed it. Support is bigger among unreligious people, younger generations and people with higher education.

A 2013-2014 investigation made with focus groups with different religious samples showed that most non-religious Costa Ricans support free abortion on woman's request only, non-practicing Catholics and most non-Christian religious minorities (except for Tibetan Buddhists) support abortion in some cases including for saving the woman's life and health and cases of rape particularly in the case of children, whilst most practicing Catholics, Mainline Protestants and Neo-Pentecostal oppose any kind of abortion even in life threatening situation.

"Rosa"
In 2003, a nine-year-old girl living in Costa Rica, known to the media as "Rosa", became pregnant after being a victim of sexual abuse. Consequently, Rosa was left in a state where her physical and emotional state was very delicate. The authorities denied her the opportunity to have an abortion, as they alleged that the consequences of an induced abortion would be worse than her carrying the pregnancy to term.  Eventually, Rosa was able to travel to Nicaragua, where, despite much controversy, she had an abortion in a private clinic.

References

Costa Rica
Costa Rica
Healthcare in Costa Rica
Society of Costa Rica
Law of Costa Rica
Women's rights in Costa Rica